= Geology of Saint Barthélemy =

The geology of Saint Barthélemy consists of andesite tuff and tuff breccia from the middle and late Eocene, intruded by hypabyssal basalt, quartz diorite and younger andesite. Volcanic activity on neighboring Saint Martin led to metamorphism of many rocks and the tilting and folding of the tuff series. Limestone and marl was later unconformably deposited atop the eroded volcanic rocks as volcanic activity shifted elsewhere.
